Notahomarus is a genus of fossil lobster belonging to the family Nephropidae that is known from fossils found only in Lebanon. The type species, N. hakelensis, was initially placed within the genus Homarus in 1878, but it was transferred to the genus Notahomarus in 2017.

Fossil record

These lobsters are related to the modern-day lobsters. They lived in warm, shallow seas during the Cenomanian period (93.9–100.5 m.y.a.). Fossils have been found at fossil sites in Hjoula and Mayfouq, Lebanon.

Description

References

Late Cretaceous crustaceans
Fossil taxa described in 2017
True lobsters
Fossils of Lebanon
Cretaceous Lebanon
Late Cretaceous arthropods of Asia